Simeonovgrad is a town in the Haskovo Province of southern Bulgaria, located on both banks of the Maritsa River. Three bridges connect the town's two parts. It is the administrative centre of the homonymous Simeonovgrad Municipality.

Landmarks 
Near Simeonovgrad lie the ruins of the Ancient Roman and Byzantine fortress of Constantia from the Late Antiquity (4th century AD), which developed into one of the large towns of Northern Thrace until the beginning of the 13th century.

Religion 
The dominant religion is Eastern Orthodox Christianity. The town has two churches, the Church of the Most Holy Mother of God in the town centre and the Church of St Nicholas the Thaumaturge in the Zlati dol quarter.

Etymology 
The town's historical names were Seymen and later, during 1872–1929, Tarnovo–Seymen – named after the Ottoman-era seymen paramilitary units. For most of the Socialist period, between 1946–1981, the town was named Maritza, after the river. The present name Simeonovgrad literally means "town of Simeon", a reference to the 10th-century Bulgarian king.

Municipality
Simeonovgrad is also the seat of Simeonovgrad municipality (part of Haskovo Province), which includes the following 8 villages:

References

External links
 Simeonovgrad municipality website

Towns in Bulgaria
Populated places in Haskovo Province